The Nonsberg Group is a mountain range in South Tyrol and Trentino in Italy and part of the Southern Limestone Alps. A large part of the Nonsberg Group is formed by the Mendelkamm.
Their highest peak is the Laugenspitze. The Nonsberg Group is bounded in the east by the Etschtal, to the north by the Prissian High Forest (Ger: Prissianer Hochwald, It: Selva di Prissiano) on the Gampen Pass (It: Passo delle Palade) and in the west by the Non Valley (Ger: Nonstal, It: Val di Non).

Location 
The boundary of the range according to the Alpine Club Classification of the Eastern Alps (AVE):
Merano – Etschtal to Mezzocorona − Noce Valley (lower Non Valley/Val di Sole) – Lago di Santa Giustina – Val di Pescara – Proveis − Lederbuch – Hofmahd – Maraunbach to its confluence with the Valschauer Bach – Ultental – Lana – Merano

Until its reclassification in AVE 1984 this group was counted as part of the Brenta Group according to the old 1924 Moriggl Classification (ME).

Important summits 
From north to south:
Laugenspitze (Monte Lucco)
Hofbichl (Monte Salomp)
Gantkofel (Monte Macaion)
Penegal
Roen (Monte Roen)
Schönleiten (Coste Belle)
Tresner Horn (Corno di Tres)
Monticello

See also 
 Fondo, Überetsch

References

External links 

 
Mountain ranges of the Alps
Mountain ranges of South Tyrol
Mountain ranges of Trentino
Southern Limestone Alps